"Around the Clock" is a single by the Japanese rock band Nothing's Carved in Stone released on December 9, 2009. It peaked at number 21 on the Oricon charts.

Track listing

References 

2009 singles
2009 songs